Pygmeocossus is a genus of moths in the family Cossidae.

Species
 Pygmeocossus simao Yakovlev, 2009
 Pygmeocossus tonga Yakovlev, 2005

References

 , 2005: Cossidae (Lepidoptera) of Andaman Islands (India). Tinea 18 (4): 257-260.
 , 2009: New taxa of African and Asian Cossidae (Lepidoptera). Euroasian Entomological Journal 8 (3): 353-361. Full article: .

External links
Natural History Museum Lepidoptera generic names catalog

Cossinae